Samuel Solomon Kelly Taiwo (born 10 November 1990), known professionally as Solomon B Taiwo, is an English actor and author.

Books published 

Solomons Shadow. (2019)
Turning Point. (2020)

Film

Television

Podcast

References

External links 
 Solomon B Taiwo on British Comedy Guide
 Solomon B Taiwo on Amazon

1990 births
21st-century English male actors
Living people
English male film actors
Male actors from London